American new wave band Berlin has released nine studio albums, two live albums, six compilation albums, two extended plays, 15 singles, three promotional singles, three video albums and 11 music videos.

Albums

Studio albums

Live albums

Compilation albums

Extended plays

Singles

Promotional singles

Guest appearances

Videography

Video albums

Music videos

Explanatory notes

References

External links
 
 
 
 

Discographies of American artists
Pop music group discographies
New wave discographies